The First Presbyterian Church is a church and historic church building located in downtown Roseburg, Oregon, United States.

The church was listed on the National Register of Historic Places in 1988.

See also
National Register of Historic Places listings in Douglas County, Oregon

References

External links
 

Presbyterian churches in Oregon
Churches on the National Register of Historic Places in Oregon
Gothic Revival church buildings in Oregon
Churches completed in 1909
National Register of Historic Places in Douglas County, Oregon
1909 establishments in Oregon
Historic district contributing properties in Oregon
Buildings and structures in Roseburg, Oregon